Medicine Bow–Routt National Forest is the official title to a U.S. Forest Service managed area extending over  in the states of Wyoming and Colorado, United States. What were once three separate areas, Medicine Bow National Forest, Routt National Forest, and Thunder Basin National Grassland were administratively combined in 1995 due to similarity of the resources, proximity to each other and for administrative purposes.

The Medicine Bow National Forest section (1,096,891 acres) is located in southeastern Wyoming and was originally created as a forest reserve in 1902. Named after the Native American powwows in which numerous tribes would congregate here in search of mountain mahogany, which was an excellent wood for the manufacturing of bows, and to perform rituals hoped to cure diseases and thus make "good medicine". The Encampment River, Huston Park, Savage Run and Platte River Wildernesses are all located within the Medicine Bow portion of the National Forest. (A small part of the Platte River Wilderness extending into Colorado is shared with Routt National Forest, as indicated below.) Vedauwoo is located immediately north of Interstate 80 and consists of numerous rock outcroppings popular with rock climbers. In descending order of land area the forest is located in Carbon, Albany, Converse, Natrona, and Platte counties. There are local ranger district offices located in Laramie, Saratoga, and Douglas.

Routt National Forest lands (1,125,438 acres) are located in northwestern Colorado. The Steamboat Ski Resort is located in the forest, on Mount Werner. The forest is named after John Routt, the first Governor of Colorado. It was established in 1905 by President Theodore Roosevelt. The forest encompasses . The Continental Divide splits the forest in half, with the east part drained by the North Platte River and the west drained by the Yampa River. Routt National Forest contains seven wilderness areas entirely or partially within it. Entirely within Routt are the Mount Zirkel and the Sarvis Creek Wildernesses. Lying mostly within neighboring forests but extending into Routt are the Flat Tops (White River NF 83.5%), Neota (Roosevelt NF 97.3%), Never Summer (Arapaho NF 68.4%), Platte River (Medicine Bow NF 96.8%), and Rawah (Roosevelt NF 98.0%) Wildernesses. In descending order of land area the forest is located in Routt, Jackson, Rio Blanco, Grand, Moffat, and Garfield counties. There are local ranger district offices located in Steamboat Springs, Walden, and Yampa.

Thunder Basin National Grassland (547,620 acres) is located in northeastern Wyoming and consists primarily of lands leased to cattle interests. In descending order of land area the grassland is located in Weston, Converse, Campbell, Niobrara, and Crook counties. There are local ranger district offices located in Douglas.

The forest headquarters is in Laramie, Wyoming.

References

Further reading

External links

 
 
National Forests of Colorado
National Forests of Wyoming
National Forests of the Rocky Mountains
Protected areas established in 1902
Protected areas of Carbon County, Wyoming
Protected areas of Albany County, Wyoming
Protected areas of Converse County, Wyoming
Protected areas of Natrona County, Wyoming
Protected areas of Platte County, Wyoming
Protected areas of Weston County, Wyoming
Protected areas of Campbell County, Wyoming
Protected areas of Niobrara County, Wyoming
Protected areas of Crook County, Wyoming
Protected areas of Routt County, Colorado
Protected areas of Jackson County, Colorado
Protected areas of Rio Blanco County, Colorado
Protected areas of Grand County, Colorado
Protected areas of Moffat County, Colorado
Protected areas of Garfield County, Colorado
1902 establishments in Wyoming
1905 establishments in Colorado
Protected areas established in 1905